The 1983–84 NCAA Division I men's basketball season began in November 1983 and ended with the Final Four in Seattle, Washington on April 2, 1984. The Georgetown Hoyas won their first NCAA national championship with an 84–75 victory over the Houston Cougars, who were making their third consecutive appearance in the Final Four.

Season headlines 

 The 1984 NCAA Tournament was the last to be contested with fewer than 64 teams.

Major rule changes 
Beginning in 1983–84, the following rules changes were implemented:
 If a team was in the bonus situation within the last two minutes of the game and all of overtime, common fouls resulted in two free throws. This rule was changed back to the one-and-one free throw situation after a month due to its unpopularity.
 Several conferences were granted permission to experiment with a 45-second shot clock (either for the entire game or shut off in the last 4:00 of the second half) the three-point shot from 19 feet, and coaching boxes to limit coaches to their bench areas.

The NCAA also implemented a significant change in Division I statistical recordkeeping, officially recording individual assists for the first time since the 1951–52 season.

Season outlook

Pre-season polls 
The top 20 from the AP Poll during the pre-season.
{|
|- style="vertical-align:top;"
|

Regular season

Conference winners and tournaments

Statistical leaders

Conference standings

Postseason tournaments

NCAA tournament

Final Four - Kingdome, Seattle, Washington

National Invitation tournament

NIT Semifinals and Final

Award winners

Consensus All-American teams

Major player of the year awards 

 Wooden Award: Michael Jordan, North Carolina
 Naismith Award: Michael Jordan, North Carolina
 Associated Press Player of the Year: Michael Jordan, North Carolina
 UPI Player of the Year: Michael Jordan, North Carolina
 NABC Player of the Year: Michael Jordan, North Carolina
 Oscar Robertson Trophy (USBWA): Michael Jordan, North Carolina
 Adolph Rupp Trophy: Michael Jordan, North Carolina
Sporting News Player of the Year: Michael Jordan, North Carolina

Major coach of the year awards 
 Associated Press Coach of the Year: Ray Meyer, DePaul
 UPI Coach of the Year: Ray Meyer, DePaul
 Henry Iba Award (USBWA): Gene Keady, Purdue
 NABC Coach of the Year: Marv Harshman, Washington
 CBS/Chevrolet Coach of the Year: Gene Keady, Purdue
 Sporting News Coach of the Year: John Thompson, Georgetown

Other major awards 
 Frances Pomeroy Naismith Award (Best player under 6'0): Ricky Stokes, Virginia
 Robert V. Geasey Trophy (Top player in Philadelphia Big 5): Ralph Lewis, Iona
 NIT/Haggerty Award (Top player in New York City metro are): Chris Mullin, St. John's and Steve Burtt, Iona

Coaching changes 

A number of teams changed coaches during the season and after it ended.

References 

 
NCAA